Mateusz Kowalczyk and David Škoch were the defending champions, but decided not to participate.
Andrey Golubev and Evgeny Korolev defeated Jesse Huta Galung and Jordan Kerr 6–3, 1–6, [10–6] in the final.

Seeds

Draw

Draw

References
 Main Draw

2013 Marburg Openandnbsp;- Doubles
2013 Doubles